The 2022 Brazilian Census was the thirteenth national population census in Brazilian history, and took place on August 1, 2022. It was intended to take place in 2020, but postponed due to the COVID-19 pandemic and budgetary issues.

The dissemination of the first results will take place by the end of April 2023.

Delays 
Originally, the census, being carried out decennially, was supposed to take place in mid-2020. However, due to the current COVID-19 pandemic, the Brazilian Institute of Geography and Statistics changed the date to 2021. 

However, in early 2021, the budget of census was cut from around 2 billion reais to only 240 million, only 12% of the original value. The census was pushed again, with Brazil's Supreme Court ruling that the government had to perform the census in 2022. 

While the original reference date was June 1, 2022, the IBGE changed the date to August 1, 2022, due to the change in the company that would hire the workers.

See also 
 Demographics of Brazil

Notes 

Censuses in Brazil